Gertrude Coghlan ( Gertrude Evelyn Coghlan; February 1, 1876 – September 11, 1952) was an English actress born in Hertfordshire, England. She is known for her role in the play The Travelling Salesman and other roles in silent cinema as: The Royal Box (1914), The Countess and the Burglar (1914) and Her Ladyship (1914).

Biography
She was Charles Francis Coghlan's daughter by Louisa Elizabeth Thorn and cousin (or older half-sister) of Charles F. Coghlan also a stage actor. Coughlan – on July 2, 1906, in Allegan, Michigan – married Augustus Pitou (1843–1915), a theatrical producer.

Gertrude joined her father's acting company, playing Juliet in the Broadway production of the Royal Box and afterwards on the road. Coghlan, who took to the stage at age sixteen, went on to have a theatrical career spanning nearly fifty years.

Coghlan died on September 11, 1952, in Bayside, New York City.

Filmography
The Royal Box (1914) as Celia Pryse
Her Ladyship (Short, 1914) as Lady Cecile
The Countess and the Burglar (Short, 1914) as The Countess

Broadway
 The Royal Box (1898) as Juliet
 The Sorceress (1904) performer (no character name)
 Once Upon A Time (1905) Dona Ana
 The Traveling Salesman (1908) as Beth Elliot
 The Noble Spaniard (1909) performer (no character name)
 Plumes in the Dust (1936) as Elizabeth Ellet

References

External links

 
 
 

American stage actresses
American silent film actresses
1876 births
1952 deaths
20th-century American actresses